Ponganalu (పొ౦గనాలు) is a traditional snack item of Andhra Pradesh, Telangana and Karnataka. It is a fluffy and smooth food item. It is sometimes stuffed with onions, corn or coriander for taste.  It is taken in combination with peanut or pudina chutney. It uses same ingredients as dosa. Some of the famous hotels are found in Hyderabad for these delicious snack, like Anil's Ponganalu point.

References

Indian snack foods
Pancakes
Stuffed dishes